The Yerrabi electorate is one of the five electorates for the unicameral 25-member Australian Capital Territory Legislative Assembly. It elected five members at the 2016 ACT election.

History
Yerrabi was created in 2016, when the five-electorate, 25-member Hare-Clark electoral system was first introduced for the Australian Capital Territory (ACT)  Legislative Assembly, replacing the previous three-electorate, 17-member system. The word "Yerrabi" is derived from an Aboriginal word in the Ngunnawal language meaning "go", "walk" or "to leave", and shares its name with Yerrabi Pond in Amaroo which is one of the main water features in the Gungahlin district.

Location
The Yerrabi electorate comprises the entire district of Gungahlin, including the suburbs of Amaroo, Bonner, Casey, Crace, Forde, Franklin, Gungahlin, Harrison, Jacka, Moncrieff, Ngunnawal, Nicholls, Palmerston, Taylor, Throsby, the Belconnen district suburbs of Giralang and Kaleen and the Township of Hall.

When created in 2016 the Yerrabi electorate additionally included the Belconnen suburbs of Evatt, Lawson and McKellar, however following the 2019 electoral redistribution, these suburbs were transferred to the Ginninderra electorate for the 2020 ACT election, making Yerrabi the smallest ACT electorate with an area of 99 km2.

Members

1Meegan Fitzharris (Labor) resigned on 8 July 2019. Deepak-Raj Gupta (Labor) was elected as her replacement on countback on 23 July 2019
2Alistair Coe (Liberal) resigned on 12 March 2021. James Milligan (Liberal) was elected as his replacement on countback on 26 March 2021

See also
 Australian Capital Territory Electoral Commission
 Australian Capital Territory Legislative Assembly

References

External links
 ACT Electoral Commission

Electorates of the Australian Capital Territory